Mrs. America may refer to;

 Mrs. America (miniseries), a 2020 US television mini-series
 Mrs. America (contest), a US national beauty pageant

See also
 Mr. and Mrs. America, a 1945 film
 Mr. America (disambiguation)
 Miss America (disambiguation)